The thirtieth season of Dancing with the Stars premiered on ABC on September 20, 2021, and concluded on November 22, 2021. This was the final season to air on ABC before the series moved to Disney+ in 2022.

NBA shooting guard Iman Shumpert and Daniella Karagach were crowned the champions, while YouTube personality JoJo Siwa and Jenna Johnson finished in second place, Peloton instructor Cody Rigsby and Cheryl Burke finished in third place, and The Talk co-host Amanda Kloots and Alan Bersten finished in fourth.

Cast

Couples
On August 26, 2021, during the virtual Television Critics Association summer press tour, it was revealed that Suni Lee and JoJo Siwa would be celebrity participants. On September 1, it was reported that Olivia Jade, Amanda Kloots, and Matt James would join them. Before the cast was officially revealed, TMZ reported that The Real Housewives of Atlanta star Kenya Moore, NBA player Iman Shumpert, and actor Brian Austin Green would also compete. Mike "The Miz" Mizanin, Jimmie Allen, and Christine Chiu were also reported to be competing. The full roster of celebrity participants were officially revealed on Good Morning America on September 8.

The season's 15 professional dancers, announced on September 2, had all performed on the show before, with Lindsay Arnold and Witney Carson returning after pregnancies. The lineup dropped Peta Murgatroyd and Keo Motsepe, who had competed in the previous season. For the first time in the series' history, one of the couples was same-sex: pansexual celebrity participant Siwa and professional dancer Jenna Johnson.

On September 10, 2021, it was announced that Sofia Ghavami and Ezra Sosa would be joining the show as professional dancers. Both dancers were showcased as part of the competing couples' dances throughout the season as well as opening numbers, and were also prepared to step in if a pro were unable to compete.

On September 26, professional dancer Cheryl Burke announced that she had tested positive for COVID-19 before the season's second episode and had to stay home and quarantine for 10 days. In the episode, Burke and her celebrity partner Cody Rigsby were judged on rehearsal footage. Rigsby tested positive for COVID-19 a few days later, though the two continued to compete, dancing together via live feed in their respective homes during week three. As of October 6, Burke was cleared to return to the ballroom, and Rigsby returned in-person during the first "Disney Week" episode.

Hosts and judges
Alongside the season renewal announcement on March 30, 2021, it was revealed that Tyra Banks would return as host, with Len Goodman, Derek Hough, Carrie Ann Inaba, and Bruno Tonioli returning as judges. For this season, each of the four judges was allowed a single vote on which dancer they would like to save. In the event of a tie vote amongst the four judges, Len's vote was considered the tie-breaker. This rule change has caused some controversy in the way it's been explained on the show, as many saw this as Len having an unfair advantage in determining which dancer is eliminated. On November 16, a day after the semi-finals, Hough announced that he tested positive with a breakthrough case of COVID-19. On November 22, 2021, it was announced Julianne Hough would fill in for her brother Derek as a guest judge for the finale.

Scoring charts

Notes

 : The couples were scored on a 30-point scale due to Derek Hough's absence.
 : This was the lowest score of the week.
 : This was the highest score of the week.
 :  This couple finished in first place.
 :  This couple finished in second place.
 :  This couple finished in third place.
 :  This couple finished in fourth place.
 :  This couple was in the bottom two, but was not eliminated.
 :  This couple was eliminated.

Highest and lowest scoring performances
The best and worst performances in each dance according to the judges' 40-point scale are as follows:

Couples' highest and lowest scoring dances
Scores are based upon a potential 40-point maximum.

Weekly scores
Individual judges' scores in the charts below (given in parentheses) are listed in this order from left to right: Carrie Ann Inaba, Len Goodman, Derek Hough, Bruno Tonioli.

Week 1: First Dances
The couples danced the cha-cha-cha, foxtrot, jive, paso doble, quickstep, salsa or tango. Couples are listed in the order they performed.

For the third time in the show's history, the official partnerships were revealed to the public during the live broadcast.

Week 2: First Elimination 
The couples danced one unlearned dance; the rumba, samba, and Viennese waltz were introduced. Couples are listed in the order they performed.

Cheryl Burke tested positive for COVID-19 the day before the live show. As a result, Cody & Cheryl did not dance live and were instead judged on their studio rehearsal footage.

Judges' votes to save
Derek: Christine & Pasha
Bruno: Christine & Pasha
Carrie Ann: Christine & Pasha
Len: Did not vote, but would have voted to save Christine & Pasha

Week 3: Britney Night 
Individual judges' scores in the chart below are listed in this order from left to right: Carrie Ann Inaba, Len Goodman, Bruno Tonioli.

The couples danced one unlearned dance to songs by pop artist Britney Spears. The Argentine tango and jazz were introduced. Couples are listed in the order they performed.

Due to both Cody Rigsby and Cheryl Burke testing positive for COVID-19 and being in quarantine, their dance was performed via live feed from their respective homes. Derek Hough also missed the live show "out of an abundance of caution" because he had a "possible COVID-19 exposure", although his test came back negative.

Judges' votes to save
Bruno: Kenya & Brandon
Carrie Ann: Kenya & Brandon
Len: Did not vote, but would have voted to save Christine & Pasha

Week 4: Disney Week 
The couples had to prepare two new dances to be performed on two consecutive nights. On Monday, they performed routines inspired by the heroes of Disney films, and on Tuesday, they performed routines inspired by the villains. Contemporary and waltz were introduced. Each couple was given the Mickey Dance Challenge where they had to incorporate dance moves that were given to them from Mickey Mouse. The judges decided at the end of the night who they thought incorporated the moves the best in their dance. The winners, Jimmie and Emma, were awarded two extra points. No elimination took place on the first night, but a double elimination occurred on the second night. Couples are listed in the order they performed.

Heroes Night

Villains Night

Judges' vote to save
 Bruno: Matt & Lindsay
 Derek: Kenya & Brandon
 Carrie Ann: Matt & Lindsay
 Len: Kenya & Brandon (Since the other judges were not unanimous, Len, as head judge, made the final decision to save Kenya & Brandon.)

Week 5: Grease Night 
The couples danced one unlearned dance to songs from the musical Grease. The Charleston was introduced. Couples are listed in the order they performed.

Judges' votes to save
Derek: Olivia & Val
Carrie Ann: Melanie & Gleb
Bruno: Melanie & Gleb
Len: Olivia & Val (Since the other judges were not unanimous, Len made the final decision to save Olivia & Val.)

Week 6: Horror Night 
The couples dance one unlearned dance inspired by a horror film or TV series. Couples are listed in the order they performed.

Judges' votes to save
 Carrie Ann: Suni & Sasha
 Derek: Suni & Sasha
 Bruno: Suni & Sasha
 Len: Did not vote, but would have voted to save Suni & Sasha

Week 7: Queen Night 
The couples danced one unlearned dance, and a dance relay with two other couples for extra points, to songs by Queen. Couples are listed in the order they performed.

Notes

Judges' votes to save
 Bruno: JoJo & Jenna
 Carrie Ann: JoJo & Jenna
 Derek: JoJo & Jenna
 Len: Did not vote, but would have voted to save JoJo & Jenna

Week 8: Janet Jackson Night 
The couples danced one unlearned dance, and a dance-off for two extra points, to songs by Janet Jackson. Two couples were sent home at the end of the night in a double elimination. Couples are listed in the order they performed.

Judges' votes to save
Derek: Melora & Artem
Bruno: Melora & Artem
Carrie Ann: Melora & Artem
Len: Did not vote, but would have voted to save Melora & Artem

Week 9: Semifinals
During the first round, the couples performed a redemption dance to a new song that was coached by one of the four judges. In the second round, they danced one unlearned dance. Two couples were sent home at the end of the night in a double elimination. Couples are listed in the order they performed.

Judges' votes to save
Carrie Ann: Amanda & Alan
Derek: Amanda & Alan
Bruno: Amanda & Alan
Len: Did not vote, but would have voted to save Amanda & Alan

Week 10: Finale
Individual judges' scores in the chart below are listed in this order from left to right: Carrie Ann Inaba, Len Goodman, Julianne Hough, Bruno Tonioli.

During the first round, the couples performed a fusion dance of two dance styles. In the second round, the couples performed a freestyle dance. Couples are listed in the order they performed. 

Because Derek Hough tested positive for COVID-19, Julianne Hough filled in as guest judge.

Dance chart
The celebrities and professional partners danced one of these routines for each corresponding week:
 Week 1 (First Dances): One unlearned dance
 Week 2 (First Elimination): One unlearned dance
 Week 3 (Britney Night): One unlearned dance
 Week 4 (Night 1, Disney Week: Heroes Night): One unlearned dance
 Week 4 (Night 2, Disney Week: Villains Night): One unlearned dance
 Week 5 (Grease Night): One unlearned dance 
 Week 6 (Horror Night): One unlearned dance 
 Week 7 (Queen Night): One unlearned dance & dance relay
 Week 8 (Janet Jackson Night): One unlearned dance & dance-off
 Week 9 (Semifinals): One dance & redemption dances
 Week 10 (Finale): Fusion dance & freestyle 

Notes

 :  This was the highest scoring dance of the week.
 :  This was the lowest scoring dance of the week.
 :  The couple gained bonus points for winning this dance-off.
 :  The couple gained no bonus points for losing this dance-off.

Ratings

References

External links

2021 American television seasons
Dancing with the Stars (American TV series)